Juho "Jussi" Olkinuora (born 4 November 1990) is a Finnish professional ice hockey goaltender currently playing for Brynäs IF of the Swedish Hockey League (SHL).

Playing career
Undrafted, Olkinuora played junior hockey in North America before attending the University of Denver to play in the Western Collegiate Hockey Association. He was signed after his sophomore season with the Pioneers by the Winnipeg Jets of the National Hockey League (NHL) on 8 April 2013.

After a career season in his lone year with the Lahti Pelicans of the Liiga in the 2018–19 season, Olkinuora left Finland to sign a one-year contract with Russian club, Admiral Vladivostok of the Kontinental Hockey League (KHL), on 15 May 2019. In the following 2019–20 season, Olkinuora was leaned on as Admirals starting goaltender, posting a .929 save percentage in 31 games.

On 17 June 2020, with Admiral Vladivostok going on a season hiatus, Olkinuora was signed as a free agent on a two-year contract with fellow KHL club, Metallurg Magnitogorsk.

In March 2022, Olkinuora left Metallurg Magnitogorsk during playoffs due to the Russian invasion of Ukraine.

As a free agent, Olkinuora was signed to a one-year contract with Swiss club, EHC Biel of the National League (NL), on 9 May 2022. On 15 June, Olkinuora left Biel after using his NHL-out clause at the deadline, agreeing to a one-year, two-way league minimum contract with the Detroit Red Wings for the 2022–23 season.

Olkinuora was re-assigned by the Red Wings following training camp to AHL affiliate, the Grand Rapids Griffins. In sharing starting duties with the Griffins, Olkinuora collected 6 wins through 15 appearances, before he was placed on unconditional waivers by the Red Wings in order to mutually terminate the remainder of his contract on 31 January 2023. On 3 February 2023, Olkinuora returned to Europe and signed his first contract in Sweden, joining cellar-dwelling Brynäs IF of the SHL for the remainder of the season.

International play

Olkinuora represented Finland at the 2019 IIHF World Championship, appearing in relief in 1 game as Finland captured the gold medal at the tournament.

At the 2022 World Championships, Olkinuora, as the starting goaltender backstopped Finland to the Gold Medal over Team Canada. He was selected as the tournament's best goalkeeper with eight wins in 8 games on 29 May 2022.

Career statistics

International

Awards and honours

References

External links
 

1990 births
Living people
Admiral Vladivostok players
Brynäs IF players
Denver Pioneers men's ice hockey players
Finnish ice hockey goaltenders
Grand Rapids Griffins players
JYP-Akatemia players
JYP Jyväskylä players
Lahti Pelicans players
Manitoba Moose players
Metallurg Magnitogorsk players
Ontario Reign (ECHL) players
SaiPa players
Sioux Falls Stampede players
Ice hockey people from Helsinki
St. John's IceCaps players
Tulsa Oilers (1992–present) players
AHCA Division I men's ice hockey All-Americans
Ice hockey players at the 2022 Winter Olympics
Olympic ice hockey players of Finland
Medalists at the 2022 Winter Olympics
Olympic gold medalists for Finland
Olympic medalists in ice hockey